The 1904 New Hampshire football team was an American football team that represented New Hampshire College of Agriculture and the Mechanic Arts during the 1904 college football season—the school became the University of New Hampshire in 1923. Under the direction of first-year head coach G. B. Ward, the team finished with a record of 2–5.

Schedule
Scoring during this era awarded five points for a touchdown, one point for a conversion kick (extra point), and four points for a field goal. Teams played in the one-platoon system and the forward pass was not yet legal. Games were played in two halves rather than four quarters.

This was the final season that New Hampshire faced Exeter Academy and Andover Academy.

The New Hampshire College Monthly reported that Carl T. Fuller scored New Hampshire's first-ever points from drop kick in the Tufts game.

New Hampshire's second team (reserves) defeated the second team of Portsmouth's Maplewood Athletic Club, 22–0, and defeated Thornton Academy in Saco, Maine, 5–0. The sophomore team (class of 1907) defeated Sanborn Seminary in Kingston, 11–0.

An end-of-season banquet was held in neighboring Newmarket on October 26; 13 players were awarded varsity letters.

Roster
The team photo consists of all 13 lettermen, plus head coach Ward and the student team manager. Two of the players in the back row have nose armor around their necks.

Source:

Notes

References

Further reading
 

New Hampshire
New Hampshire Wildcats football seasons
New Hampshire football